Yogananda Institute of Technology and Science (YITS) is located in Tirupati, Andhra Pradesh, India. It was established by the Yogananda Educational Society (YES) in 2008. The Society established the engineering college to impart education to the children hailing from the backward areas of Rayalaseema region. Yogananda Educational Society is headed by Smt.D.Subhadramma as Chairperson, Sri D.Mohan Reddy as secretary and correspondent of YITS.

YITS is located at a distance of 10 km from Tirupati, 3 km from Tirupati Airport on the 205 Chennai-Tirupati-Bangalore National Highway and 2 km from Renigunta Junction railway station.

Academics
The college is approved by AICTE, New Delhi & affiliated to Jawaharlal Nehru Technological University, Anantapur.  The institute offers six Engineering undergraduate courses viz. Civil Engineering (CE), Computer Science & Engineering (CSE), Electronics and Communication Engineering (ECE), Electrical and Electronics engineering (EEE), Information Technology (IT) and Mechanical Engineering (ME) along with Master of Business Administration (MBA).  The institute is firmly committed in getting itself recognized with NBA.

External links 
 
 Five awards for YITS chairman

Engineering colleges in Andhra Pradesh
Universities and colleges in Tirupati
Educational institutions established in 2008
2008 establishments in Andhra Pradesh